Goop may refer to:
Alfons Goop (1910–1993), Liechtenstein Nazi leader
Goops, a 1900 book series by Gelett Burgess
 Shoe Goo or Sportsman's Goop, a brand of waterproof seam-sealer
Goop, a brand of liquid hand cleaner containing finely pulverized pumice to aid in soil removal.
 Goop, a character from Ben 10: Alien Force
 Goop (company), a lifestyle brand and online retailer by actress Gwyneth Paltrow
 Plastigoop, a substance associated with Creepy Crawlers toys
 An ongoing project to add a dynamic object-oriented programming (OOP) layer to the Go programming language
 Go-Op (train operating company), in Bristol, UK

See also
Goo (disambiguation)
Slime (disambiguation)